The Newport, Kentucky, World Peace Bell is one of more than twenty Peace Bells around the world. It weighs 30,000 kg  (66,000 lb) and is 3.7 m (12 feet) wide. From 2000 until 2006, it was the largest swinging bell in the world. It was dedicated on December 31, 1999, and was first swung as the year 2000 opened. In keeping with its theme of world peace, the bell features an inscription commemorating the Universal Declaration of Human Rights and engravings marking important events from the past 1,000 years.

History 
The plan in 1997 was to cast the bell near Newport, Kentucky, in an on-site foundry. The bell would have hung in a  Millennium Monument tower to open on New Year's Eve 1999, with an 85-bell carillon featuring this bell as its largest. At first the bell was called "The Millennium Bell." Later the plans were reduced to a smaller tower for the bell with an accompanying museum.

The Verdin Company managed the project on the U.S. side on behalf of the Millennium Monument Company. On December 11, 1998, the 50th anniversary of the Universal Declaration of Human Rights, the bell was cast on the premises of a ship propeller foundry in Nantes, France, under the strict supervision of staff from French bellfounders Fonderie Paccard of Annecy. The mastermind behind this bell was veteran bellfounder Pierre Paccard who accomplished this mammoth feat together with his sons, Philippe and Cyril Paccard, under the close collaboration of Master Founder Miguel Lopez.

The World Peace Bell was first rung in Nantes on March 20, 1999, in a public ceremony. It then underwent a month-and-a-half-long sea voyage from France to the U.S. port of New Orleans, Louisiana, where the bell was made part of that city's Fourth of July celebration. The bell was then transported by barge up the Mississippi and Ohio Rivers, making stops in 14 cities along the way and arriving at its final destination in northern Kentucky on August 1. Its arrival coincided with the 1999 Tall Stacks Festival, held along the Cincinnati-Covington-Newport section of the Ohio River. This event was named the nation's "Top Tourism Event" by the American Bus Association in 1999.

For the first time in the U.S., the bell was rung by swinging on January 1, 2000, at midnight.

The striker is of cast iron and was produced at Cast-Fab Technologies, Inc., in Cincinnati, Ohio. A special iron was used to prevent the striker from damaging the bell when it hits the outside rim of the bell (see right side of photo). The striker allows the bell to be chimed without swinging it.

The bell tower and the bell and most of the other components of the Millennium Monument, were produced at companies local to the Newport, Kentucky, area. The World Peace Bell Center is located at 425 York Street, Newport, Kentucky, 41071, USA.

See also
 Japanese Peace Bell

Notes

External links
 YouTube video of the peacebell in action
 In Honor of the Peace Bell and Newport, Kentucky. Congressional Record: August 5, 1999 (Extension of Remarks) Page E1798. DOCIC:crau99pt2-86.
 City of Newport, Ky
 Paccard Foundry (in French)

1998 establishments in Kentucky
Buildings and structures celebrating the third millennium
Buildings and structures completed in 1998
Buildings and structures in Campbell County, Kentucky
Individual bells in the United States
Landmarks in Kentucky
NBBJ buildings
Newport, Kentucky
Peace monuments and memorials
Tourist attractions in Campbell County, Kentucky